David Wayman (born 27 January 1988) is an English actor.

Early life 
Wayman (born David Place) grew up in Enfield, London and attended Lochinver House School and St. Columba's College.

Aged 18, he joined The Rifles as a reservist.

Career 
Wayman trained at East 15 Acting School in Loughton.

Early work saw him taking a lead role in Martin Gooch's After Death opposite Ben Shockley, Leslie Phillips and Paul Freeman, before playing a leading role in Knight Knight in 2012.

In 2014, he was featured in the Evening Standard for having lead roles in five films at Cannes Film Festival.

In 2014, he starred in Wandering Rose, released by Entertainment One and Shoreline Entertainment's Art Ache.

Filmography

Film

Television

References

External links 
 
 
 Death Official Website
 Interview for Moon Project
 Interview in Geektown

English male film actors
Living people
English male television actors
1988 births